In mathematics, the group algebra can mean either
A group ring of a group over some ring.
A group algebra of a locally compact group.